Progress Reform is an EP by the Leeds-based post-rock group I Like Trains. The EP's title is a reference to the lyrics of "The Beeching Report", which are concerned with the 1960s Beeching Axe British railway reforms. Other songs on the EP have other historical implications.

 "Terra Nova" – Robert Scott's doomed mission to the South Pole in 1912.
 "No Military Parade" – Roald Amundsen and the events after the polar expedition.
 "A Rook House for Bobby" – tells the story of Bobby Fischer's 1992  chess match against Boris Spassky in Yugoslavia, after which Fischer was unable to return to the USA. The song's video includes a high-speed animation of the final game, with which Fischer won the match.
 "The Beeching Report" – the effects of Dr Richard Beeching's report.

Track listing
 "Terra Nova" – 4:59
 "No Military Parade" – 3:27
 "A Rook House For Bobby" – 4:43
 "Citizen" – 3:02
 "The Accident" – 3:02
 "Stainless Steel" – 8:19
 "The Beeching Report" – 4:42
 "Before the Curtains Close" – 5:32 (American version only, which also includes the "Terra Nova" video)

Typography
The titles of the songs on the CD case employ the same capitalisation format as the band's name, capitalising all letters except for i's. Versions for digital download and streaming do not typically follow this practice.

Personnel
 David Martin: vocals and guitar
 Guy Bannister: guitars and keys
 Alistair Bowis: bass
 Ashley Dean: images and cornet
 Simon Fogal: drums and percussion

Credits
 All music written and performed by I Like Trains
 All songs produced and mixed by I Like Trains
 All songs engineered by Daniel Skevington
 Except "Terra Nova" produced and mixed by I Like Trains and Dan Austin for 140 dB
 "No Military Parade" recorded by Nathanial Chan
 Drums on "The Accident" recorded by Dan Austin
 All songs recorded at the Wortley Studio and the I Like Trains Cellar using the Rumpus Room mobile recording facility except "Terra Nova" recorded at the Miloco Neve Room.

Note: Since this "EP" runs for over 30 minutes, it is technically an album.

I Like Trains albums
2006 EPs
Fierce Panda Records EPs
Albums produced by Dan Austin